The white-sided jackrabbit (Lepus callotis), also known as the Mexican hare, is a jackrabbit found in a limited range in North America, from southern New Mexico to northwestern and central Mexico. The animal is considered threatened in New Mexico, with its numbers in decline in recent years; its presence is uncertain in Arizona.

Habitat
The white-sided jackrabbit inhabits plateaus at high elevations, including the grassy plains of southwestern New Mexico and the open plains of the southern Mexican tableland. It avoids areas of hills or mountains. It prefers level lands full of grasses and also avoids areas with trees and shrubs.

Description
The white-sided jackrabbit's ears grow  when fully grown. The fore paws have five toes while the back paws have four. All toes end in sturdy claws. Some sexual dimorphism is present in this species; females are generally larger than the males.

The dorsal pelage of the white-sided jackrabbit is short and coarse. The color is pale cinnamon color heavily mixed with black. The underparts are white with traces of colored patches in front of the thighs. The tail has black hairs tipped with white on the upper surface and is all white on the underside. The sides are distinguishable from other species in that they are pure white, the source of their name. The rump and thighs are also white and lined with a few black hairs. A median black line concealed by sooty, brownish, and white-tipped hairs divides the rump. The limbs are white, but their outer surfaces are stained a buff color. The gular pouch is also buffy while the sides of the neck and shoulders become more ochraceous in color. The head is a cream buff color, mixed with black, with whitish areas around the sides of the eyes. The ears are covered with short yellowish-brown hairs that are mixed with black anteriorly and white posteriorly. The apex of the ear is white-tipped. Below the apex of the ear is a tuft of black hair. The long fringes on the anterior edge of the ear are ochraceous buff, while the fringes of the tip of the ear and posterior edge are white. The inner surface of the ear is almost bare except for a dusky spot on the posterior border. The nape is ochraceous buff in color.

The winter pelage of the white-sided jackrabbit is iron gray on the rump, back, and outside of the hind legs. The front of the hind legs and the tops of the feet are white. The front of the fore legs and top of the fore feet range from a pale gray to a dull iron-gray. The median black line of the rump is not strongly distinguishable and does not extend much further than the base of the tail. The top, sides, and tip of the tail are black, while the underside is two-thirds white and one-third black. The top and sides of the head and back are dark-pinkish buff overlaid with black. The nape is usually black. The ears are dark bluff, black, and white. The front border of the ears are fringed with buff or ochraceous buff hairs, and the posterior border and tip are white. The underside of the neck is dark grayish bluff and the remaining underparts, including the flanks, are white.

Reproduction
The breeding season of the white-sided jackrabbit is a minimum of 18 weeks, occurring from mid-April to mid-August. The average number of young per litter is around two. The young tend to have a soft, woolly coat in early life and attain sexual maturity at a rapid rate. Breeding in L. callotis does not begin within the first calendar year following its birth.

Behavior
Most activity of the white-sided jackrabbit occurs during the night or at dusk, particularly on clear nights with bright moonlight. Its activity may be limited by cloud cover, precipitation, and wind, but temperature has little effect. Its escape behavior consists of alternately flashing its white sides when running away. The white-sided jackrabbit, when escaping, makes rather long, high leaps. When startled by or alarmed by a predator, it leaps straight upwards while extending the hind legs and flashing the white sides. In its resting position, a white-sided jackrabbit is camouflaged with its surroundings. The long hind legs and feet are adapted for speed, giving the animal lift and an ability to run in a zig-zag fashion that surpasses its pursuers. The long ears serve to locate sound, as well as regulate temperature when they are raised like a fan to catch passing breezes in hot conditions. The eyes, like those of most nocturnal or crepuscular animals, are laterally arranged, giving them a complete field of vision (360°). As a result, approaching danger can be perceived in advance.

A conspicuous trait of the white-sided jackrabbit is its tendency to be found in pairs, usually one male and one female. Its pair bond is most evident during the breeding season. After establishment of the pair bond, the male defends the pair from other intruding males. The purpose of such pair bonds may be to keep the sexes together in areas of low density. The members of the pair are usually within 15–20 ft of each other and run together when approached by intruders. The pair bond may not be broken during pregnancy.

The shelter form is usually located in clumps of grass and surrounded by dense stands of tobosa grass. The white-sided jackrabbit may also occupy underground shelters, but this behavior is rare. It forages by chewing and pulling grass blades near the ground until they are either uprooted or broken off. The food is ingested by chewing the grass sticking out of the mouth, with the head raised and the body sitting in a crouched position. The fore paws are not used in feeding except to brace against the ground as the grass is bitten off or uprooted. When eating certain nutgrass, however, the fore paws are used to excavate the bulbous tubers, leaving behind oval foraging depressions in which fecal pellets are often deposited.

The white-sided jackrabbit has three types of vocalizations. The alarm or fear reaction consists of a high-pitched scream. Another sound, emitted by males in a pair when approached by an outside intruding male, is a series of harsh grunts until the intruder leaves or is chased away. A third vocalization, consisting of a trilling grunt, is heard during the sexual chase of the white-sided jackrabbit, but it is not known which member of the pair makes this sound.

Food
The diet of the white-sided jackrabbit consists primarily of grasses including buffalograss, tobosagrass, fiddleneck, wolftail, blue grama, vine mesquite, ring muhly, wooly Indian wheat, and Wright buckwheat. The significant nongrass item found in their diets was sedge nutgrass.

Human interaction and impact
Although many species of jackrabbits and hares are considered pests because they damage crops, fields, and orchards, the white-sided jackrabbit is usually not considered a pest and has no known adverse effects on human property. Many species are also sought after for their meat and fur.  This is also untrue of the white-sided jackrabbit and it is protected in most of its habitat region.

A 2011 study by the New Mexico Department of Game and Fish determined that the primary cause of decline of the white sided jackrabbit in New Mexico was due to road kill caused by nighttime US Border Patrol traffic.

Conservation efforts
The white-sided jackrabbit is considered endangered throughout its range in Mexico, and is listed as threatened by New Mexico, where it occurs in the southwest, but enjoys no federal protection in the United States. A 2011 study by the state of New Mexico estimated the population to be 45 individuals. The white-sided jackrabbit commonly comes into contact with agriculture. As a result, the overgrazing of domestic livestock may be one of the factors contributing to its decline and the apparent replacement by the black-tailed jackrabbit (Lepus californicus), which has been highly adaptable to these habitat changes. Prospects for the survival of the white-sided jackrabbit in many parts of its range are considered poor at best.

Subspecies
The two subspecies of this jackrabbit are:
L. c. callotis
L. c. gaillardi

References

White-sided Jackrabbit
Mammals of Mexico
Mammals of the United States
Natural history of Chihuahua (state)
Endemic fauna of New Mexico
Natural history of Sonora
Mammals described in 1830